Bhandarkhal massacre may refer to:
 1806 Bhandarkhal massacre, led by Bhimsen Thapa
 1846 Bhandarkhal massacre, led by Jung Bahadur Rana